Retroactive Abortion is the debut album by American grindcore band Venomous Concept. It was released on June 29, 2004, through Ipecac Recordings. In 2006, Belgian record label Hypertension Records re-issued the album on vinyl.

Critical reception

The album generally received mixed reviews from music critics. Scott McKeating of Stylus Magazine thought that the album was "defiantly loud, messy and loose, but it could’ve done with being a lot more abrasive; the lo-fi production sounds underdone." McKeating concluded: "Chopped down to a fistful of songs this would’ve made a great EP, but even at thirty minutes this album is way too long." Exclaim! critic Greg Pratt wrote: "Venomous Concept had brilliance written all over it. Ultimately, it falls a bit short of that however, being more of a fun, jam-room one-off project." PopMatters' Adrien Begrand described the record as "a moderately enjoyable hardcore album… if you ignore the lyrics, that is."

Track listing
"Weirdo" – 2:21
"Oink!" – 1:04
"Rhetoric" – 2:30
"I Said It Before" – 1:51
"Freakbird" – 1:29
"Infest" – 0:36
"Life's Line" – 1:54
"Idiot Parade" – 2:31
"Hard On" – 2:00
"Group Hug" – 1:33
"Anti-Social" – 1:12
"Run Around" – 1:25
"Smash" – 1:41
"Monkey See - Monkey Beat" – 1:10
"Total Recall" – 1:54
"Braincrash" – 2:14
"Think!"
"Total War" (QuickTime bonus video)

Personnel
Venomous Concept
Shane Embury – bass guitar
Kevin Sharp – vocals
Buzz Osborne – guitar
Danny Herrera – drums

Other personnel
Oscar Garcia – additional vocals
Venomous Concept – production
Huey Dee – engineering
Phil Wright – assistant engineering

References

External links
 

2004 debut albums
Ipecac Recordings albums
Venomous Concept albums
Hypertension Records albums